Senegal is subdivided into 14 regions (French: régions, singularrégion), each of which is administered by a Conseil Régional (pl.: Conseils Régionaux) elected by population weight at the arrondissement level. 
Senegal is further subdivided into 45 departments, 103 arrondissements (neither of which have administrative function) and by collectivités locales (the 14 regions, 110 communes, and 320 communautés rurales) which elect administrative officers. Three of these regions were created on 10 September 2008, when Kaffrine Region was split from Kaolack, Kédougou region was split from Tambacounda, and Sédhiou region was split from Kolda.

To date, all regions take their name from their regional capitals.

See also 
 List of Senegalese regions by Human Development Index
 Departments of Senegal
 Arrondissements of Senegal
 ISO 3166-2:SN

References

External links 
List of administrative divisions in Senegal
Collectivités locales from Republic of Senegal Government site, l'Agence de l'informatique de l'État (ADIE).
Map of main subdivisions and more detailed maps on subdivisions
Décret fixant le ressort territorial et le chef lieu des régions et des départements, décret n°2002-166 du 21 février 2002.
Code des collectivités locales, Loi n° 96-06 du 22 mars 1996.

 
Subdivisions of Senegal
Senegal, Regions
Senegal 1
Regions, Senegal
Senegal geography-related lists